Taylor Davies (born 30 July 1995) is a Welsh rugby union player. A hooker, he plays rugby for the Scarlets.

References 

1995 births
Living people
Scarlets players
Rugby union hookers
Rugby union players from Swansea
Welsh rugby union players
Dragons RFC players